Liu Yi (born 26 January 1997) is a Chinese footballer who currently plays as a midfielder for Kunshan.

Club career
Liu Yi was promoted to China League One side Hangzhou Greentown's first team squad in 2017. He made his senior debut on 12 March 2017, playing the whole match in a 3–2 home win over Nei Mongol Zhongyou. He went on to make ten appearances for the club in all competitions in the 2017 season.

Liu received trial with Chinese Super League side Tianjin Quanjian in December 2017 and made an official transfer on 26 February 2018. On 2 March 2018, he made his debut for the club in a 4–0 away win against Henan Jianye, coming on as a substitute for Wang Yongpo in the 76th minute.

Liu joined second tier club Kunshan on 4 August 2020. He would go on to make his debut in a league game on 13 September 2020 against Sichuan Jiuniu in a 2-0 victory. This would be followed by his first goal for the club in a league game on 4 October 2020 against Nantong Zhiyun in a 1-0 victory. He would go on to establish himself as regular within the team and was part of the squad that won the division and promotion to the top tier at the end of the 2022 China League One campaign.

Career statistics
.

Honours

Club 
Kunshan
 China League One: 2022

References

External links
 

1997 births
Living people
Chinese footballers
People from Guiyang
Footballers from Guizhou
Zhejiang Professional F.C. players
Tianjin Tianhai F.C. players
Kunshan F.C. players
Chinese Super League players
China League One players
Association football midfielders